Edvinas Ramanauskas (born 18 August 1985, in Šiauliai) is a Lithuanian sprint canoer. 

In 2014 Canoe Sprint European Championships Edvinas Ramanauskas and Aurimas Lankas won silver medals in K2-200 m event. In 2014 World Championships Lankas and Ramanauskas reached the final where they finished in 5th place.

He competed for Lithuania at the 2016 Summer Olympics in Rio de Janeiro. Along with partner Aurimas Lankas, he won the bronze medal in the men's kayak double 200m. He was the flag bearer for Lithuania during the closing ceremony.

References

1985 births
Lithuanian male canoeists
Living people
People from Šiauliai
European Games competitors for Lithuania
Canoeists at the 2015 European Games
Canoeists at the 2016 Summer Olympics
Olympic canoeists of Lithuania
Olympic bronze medalists for Lithuania
Olympic medalists in canoeing
Medalists at the 2016 Summer Olympics